Jarvis is a ghost town in Anderson County, in the U.S. state of Texas. It is a part of the Palestine, Texas micropolitan area. Although it is considered a ghost town by the Handbook of Texas, the Geographic Names Information System classifies it as an unincorporated community.

History
An unsuccessful oil-drilling operation occurred in the area in 1909. In the 1930s, the community had a few homes, two churches, and only one operating business. Then the 1982 county highway map showed a few scattered houses in Jarvis, while a church named Fields Chapel was located a half mile north of the area along U.S. Highway 84. The community has never been listed on county highway maps since 1985, but the church was still in operation.

Geography

See also
Wild Cat Bluff, Texas

References

Ghost towns in East Texas
Ghost towns in Texas